Moshchun or Moschun is a village (selo) in Bucha Raion, Kyiv Oblast, Ukraine. It belongs to the Hostomel settlement hromada, one of the hromadas of Ukraine.  Most of the village was destroyed during Russia's attempt to capture Kyiv as part of its 2022 invasion.

History 

Moshchun was originally named Pylneiu after the many sawmills in the village.

The May 21, 1656 Universal of Hetman Bohdan Khmelnytsky gifted Moshchun, Vyshhorod, and Novi Petrivtsi to the Mezhyhirya Monastery.

In 1886, Moshchun had a population of 203.

The Russian language television programs Muhtar's Return & Svaty were both filmed in Moshchun.

During the 2022 Russian invasion of Ukraine, the village was the site of the important Battle of Moshchun. Ukrainian forces held their positions at Moshchun against many Russian attacks, and it became one of the key strongholds protecting Kyiv. 70% of buildings in the village were destroyed during the battle.

Gallery

References 

Villages in Bucha Raion